The girls' doubles of the tournament 2019 BWF World Junior Championships will be held from 7 to 13 October 2019. The defending champions is Liu Xuanxuan/Xia Yuting from China.

Seeds 

  Nita Violina Marwah / Putri Syaikah (quarterfinals)
  Li Yijing / Luo Xumin (semifinals)
  Febriana Dwipuji Kusuma / Amalia Cahaya Pratiwi (final)
  Lin Fangling / Zhou Xinru (champions)
  Pornpicha Choeikeewong / Pornnicha Suwatnodom (third round)
  Christine Busch / Amalie Schulz (quarterfinals)
  Melani Mamahit / Tryola Nadia (quarterfinals)
  Bengisu Erçetin / Zehra Erdem (second round)

  Dounia Pelupessy / Milena Schnider (second round)
  Leona Michalski / Emma Moszczynski (fourth round)
  Asmita Chaudhari / Annie Lado (second round)
  Aditi Bhatt / Tanisha Crasto (fourth round)
  Kaho Osawa / Hinata Suzuki (semifinals)
  Julie Franconville / Caroline Racloz (third round)
  Anastasiia Kurdyukova / Anastasiia Shapovalova (third round)
  Lucie Krpatová / Kateřina Zuzáková (second round)

Draw

Finals

Top half

Section 1

Section 2

Section 3

Section 4

Bottom half

Section 5

Section 6

Section 7

Section 8

References

2019 BWF World Junior Championships